The discography of The Birthday Party, an Australian post-punk band, consists of four studio albums, two live albums, six compilation albums, six extended plays and nine singles. The group began under various names in Melbourne in 1973; formed by vocalist Nick Cave, guitarist Mick Harvey, drummer Phill Calvert, guitarist John Cocivera, bassist Brett Purcell, and saxophonist Chris Coyne —all of whom were students at Caulfield Grammar School. By 1978, following several membership changes, the band consisted of Cave, Harvey and Calvert with bassist Tracy Pew and guitarist Rowland S Howard. Under the name The Boys Next Door, the band released several singles and two studio albums, Door, Door in 1979 on Mushroom Records and The Birthday Party in 1980 on Missing Link Records.

Despite moderate success in Australia, The Boys Next Door relocated to London, England in 1980 and changed their name to The Birthday Party. In London, the band experienced underground critical success with a series of singles and two further studio albums, Prayers on Fire (1981) and Junkyard (1982); Junkyard was also a minor commercial success, peaking at number 72 on the UK Albums Chart upon its release. In 1982, the band relocated to West Berlin, Germany and Calvert departed. The band, now featuring Harvey on dual guitar and drumming duties, released as two EPs, The Bad Seed and Mutiny!, in 1983 on 4AD and Mute Records. Featuring Einstürzende Neubauten member Blixa Bargeld as a guest musician, they were the band's final recordings prior to their disbandment in late 1983.

Cave, Harvey, Barry Adamson and Bargeld formed Nick Cave and the Bad Seeds in December 1983 and Howard joined Crime and the City Solution, as well as forming These Immortal Souls in the wake of The Birthday Party's break-up. The band's back catalogue has been reissued several times, usually in the form of compilation albums such as Mutiny/The Bad Seed (1989) and Hits (1992), and several unreleased recordings and video albums have been released since their disbandment. Though the band did not experience commercial success during their career, they have been recognised as having a major impact on the gothic rock genre and influencing several subsequent bands, including My Bloody Valentine, Gogol Bordello and LCD Soundsystem.

Albums

Studio albums

Live albums

Compilation albums

Box sets

Extended plays

Singles

Retail singles

Split singles

Demos

Music videos

Video releases

Notes

References

External links

Discographies of Australian artists
Rock music discographies